Night of the Apocalypse is the second live performance recording by Polish death metal band Vader. It was released on 25 October 2004 by Metal Mind.

Night of the Apocalypse main show was recorded at Łeg Studio in Kraków on 25 March 2003. Bonus material consists fragments of Vader performance recorded at Metalmania Festival in Spodek in Katowice on 5 April 2003, and bands show as Slipknot & Metallica support recorded at Silesian Stadium in Chorzów on 31 May 2004.

The DVD also includes fully animated menu, band biography, downloadable desktop images, photo gallery, weblinks, discography, and interviews with Piotr "Peter" Wiwczarek, Krzysztof "Docent" Raczkowski, Maurycy "Mauser" Stefanowicz, and Konrad "Saimon" Karchut.

Track listing

Personnel 
Production and performance credits are adapted from the album liner notes.

References 

Concert films
Vader (band) albums
2004 live albums
2004 video albums
Live video albums
Metal Mind Productions video albums
Polish-language live albums